Forbidden Broadway Goes to Rehab is the 2008 incarnation of Gerard Alessandrini's long-running hit Off-Broadway musical revue Forbidden Broadway, which parodies notable current Broadway and Off-Broadway musicals. It was initially announced that this would be the final version of the show, until the franchise was revived with Forbidden Broadway: Alive & Kicking! in 2012 and Forbidden Broadway Comes Out Swinging! in 2014.

Production
Forbidden Broadway Goes to Rehab opened on September 17, 2008 at New York's 47th Street Theatre  and closed on March 1, 2009. The show was conceived, created and written by Alessandrini and was co-directed by Alessandrini and Phillip George.

The plays and musicals parodied in Forbidden Broadway Goes to Rehab include August: Osage County, Equus, Spring Awakening, In the Heights, A Tale of Two Cities, South Pacific, Mary Poppins, Gypsy, Sunday In The Park With George, Young Frankenstein, and Xanadu. The personalities portrayed include Bernadette Peters, Patti LuPone, Liza Minnelli and Kristin Chenoweth.

Opening cast 

 Christina Bianco
 Jared Bradshaw
 Gina Kreiezmar
 Michael West
 David Caldwell, music director and piano

Replacements and understudies 
 James Donegan replaced Jared Bradshaw
 Kristen Mengelkoch, female understudy
 William Selby, male understudy/dance captain

Original cast album 
The tracks featured on the cast recording
 Forbidden Broadway Goes to Rehab
 All That Chat
 In the Heights Segment
 Tale of Two Cities Segment
 South Pacific Segment
 Mary Poppins: 2nd Season
 August: Osage County
 Daniel Radcliffe in Equus
 Patti Lupone [sic] In Gypsy
 Young Frankenstein
 Xanadude
 Kristen [sic] Chenoweth: Glitter and Be Glib
 Sondheim: Putting Up Revivals
 Stephen Sondheim Finale
 My Musical Comedy Smile
 The Pajama Game
 See Me on a Monday
 (Dying Is Easy) Comedy Is Hard

See also 
 Forbidden Broadway
 Forbidden Broadway, Vol. 1
 Forbidden Broadway, Vol. 2
 Forbidden Broadway, Vol. 3
 Forbidden Hollywood
 Forbidden Broadway Strikes Back
 Forbidden Broadway Cleans Up Its Act
 Forbidden Broadway: 20th Anniversary Edition
 Forbidden Broadway 2001: A Spoof Odyssey
 Forbidden Broadway: Special Victims Unit
 Forbidden Broadway: Rude Awakening

References

External links
 ForbiddenBroadway.com

2008 musicals
Off-Broadway musicals
Revues